The 1957 NCAA Men's Ice Hockey Tournament was the culmination of the 1956–57 NCAA men's ice hockey season, the 10th such tournament in NCAA history. It was held between March 14 and 16, 1957, and concluded with Colorado College defeating Michigan 13–6. All games were played at the Broadmoor Ice Palace in Colorado Springs, Colorado.

Colorado College tied their own record for most goals scored in a championship game with 13. Additionally, the 6 goals that Michigan scored made it the title match with the highest number of combined goals scored (19).

Qualifying teams
Four teams qualified for the tournament, two each from the eastern and western regions. The two best WIHL teams and a Tri-State League representative received bids into the tournament as did one independent school.

Format
The eastern team judged as better was seeded as the top eastern team while the WIHL champion was given the top western seed. The second eastern seed was slotted to play the top western seed and vice versa. All games were played at the Broadmoor Ice Palace. All matches were Single-game eliminations with the semifinal winners advancing to the national championship game and the losers playing in a consolation game.

Bracket

Note: * denotes overtime period(s)

Semifinals

Colorado College vs. Clarkson

Harvard vs. Michigan

Consolation Game

Harvard vs. Clarkson

Championship Game

Colorado College vs. Michigan

All-Tournament Team

First Team
G: Eddie MacDonald (Clarkson)
D: Bob Pitts (Michigan)
D: Don Wishart (Colorado College)
F: Bill Hay (Colorado College)
F: Bob McCusker* (Colorado College)
F: Tom Rendall (Michigan)
* Most Outstanding Player(s)

Second Team
G: Ross Childs (Michigan)
D: Dick McGhee (Colorado College)
D: Bob Schiller (Michigan)
F: Bob McVey (Harvard)
F: Dick Dunnigan (Michigan)
F: John Andrews (Colorado College)

References

Tournament
NCAA Division I men's ice hockey tournament
NCAA Men's Ice Hockey Tournament
NCAA Men's Ice Hockey Tournament
1950s in Colorado Springs, Colorado
Ice hockey competitions in Colorado Springs, Colorado